The buff-rumped thornbill (Acanthiza reguloides) is a species of thornbill found in open forest land in eastern Australia, specifically from south of Chinchilla, Queensland and east of Cobar, New South Wales, across Victoria and southeastern South Australia, in an area of about . The buff-rumped thornbill is found in temperate or subtropical/tropical moist environments living and feeding amidst the foliage or on the ground. However, they are known to prefer nesting sites one to two metres above ground level, particularly amongst the bark of trees. Of a similar size to other thornbills, 8–10 cm long, the buff-rumped thornbill is identifiable by its "buff-coloured rump and belly" and white irides in its eyes.

Since 1926 the buff-rumped thornbill and the varied thornbill (A. squamata) have been combined as a single species, despite considerable differences between extreme examples of the two groups. The buff-rumped thornbill is described as 'uncommon' on some occasions. However, it is not deemed to be endangered and has been in the low risk category for the International Union for Conservation of Nature and Natural Resources since 1988.

References

buff-rumped thornbill
Birds of Queensland
Birds of New South Wales
Birds of Victoria (Australia)
Endemic birds of Australia
buff-rumped thornbill
Articles containing video clips